Hagerman's Corners is a dispersed rural community in Markham, Ontario, Canada. Located at 14th Avenue and Kennedy Road, the former farm lands have disappeared and given way to homes and commercial parks. It is geographically located between the communities of Milliken Mills and Unionville, within the city of Markham.

Hagerman's Corners was founded in 1803 by Nicholas Hagerman, who owned the property at the NW corner of the intersection. By 1878 the village had a hotel (Bee Hive Hotel) and tavern, a general store and post office (1873), and a wagon maker. In 1849, a Wesleyan Methodist church was built on a private Hagerman family burying ground; the wood-frame church was replaced by a brick building in 1874. While the church was torn down in the 1920s, the cemetery on the east side of Kennedy Road (on James Fairless' farm), north of 14th Avenue remains with former Presbyterian church demolished. A few historical homes still exist and have been revitalized in an attempt to beautify the area.

Today, the west side of Kennedy Road is home to a new public housing project for the city of Markham. Two small strip malls with mostly Chinese stores are located on the southwest corner of 14th Avenue and Kennedy Road. One of the shopping areas houses the First Choice Supermarket, a Chinese-based supermarket (formerly Big Land Farm) and Tim Hortons; the other is home to various Asian restaurants. Hagerman Mennonite Church has met in the village since 1932.

Transportation
 Highway 407 traverses along the northern edge of the community.
 14th Avenue, the main east–west thoroughfare
 Kennedy Road, traverses the eastern edge of the community.
 Warden Avenue, traverses the western edge of the community.
Birchmount Road, the main north–south thoroughfare.

References

Neighbourhoods in Markham, Ontario